The MX2 is a carbon fiber, two seat tandem sport aircraft produced by MX Aircraft of Perth, Western Australia. The MX2 has been used by competitors in the annual Red Bull Air Race World Championship.

Design and development
The MX2 was based on the Giles G-202 aerobatic trainer, the first prototype was a modified G-202 and first flew in May 2002. The first aircraft of the initial production batch of five first flew in May 2005. The MX2 is a carbon-fibre low wing cantilever monoplane with full span ailerons and a conventional landing gear with a tailwheel. It has an enclosed cockpit for two in tandem on reclining seats and a single piece canopy. The MX2 is powered by a  260 hp (194 kW) Lycoming IO-540 flat-six piston engine with a three-blade tractor propeller.  Optimised for aerobatic speed and agility the MX2 can pull a G-load of plus and minus 14 Gs, giving it tight turns and loops and a range of aerobatic maneuvers.

Rob Holland (pilot) won the 2008 World Advanced Aerobatic Championships in a MX2 and the 2018 US National Aerobatic Championships.

An MX2 raced a Supermarine Spitfire around the Isle of Wight for the 70th anniversary of the first Spitfire produced. The Spitfire won.

Specifications

See also

References
Citations

Bibliography

External links 

 Official MX Aircraft website

Low-wing aircraft
2000s United States sport aircraft
Aerobatic aircraft
Single-engined tractor aircraft
Aircraft first flown in 2002
Conventional landing gear